John Esten Miles (July 28, 1884October 7, 1971) was an American politician who served as the 12th governor of the state of New Mexico.

Biography
Miles was born in Murfreesboro, Tennessee. He attended the common schools of Tennessee, but left home at the age of seventeen. He settled in Texas and began farming. he did moderately well in that field, but a crop failure in 1906 convinced him to move to Oklahoma and then to New Mexico. He took a homestead there and married Susie C. Wade. Susie Wade was a member of the Choctaw Nation.

Miles began to dabble in politics as an observer at first. When the United States Democratic Party began to take back the New Mexico Legislature in the 1920s, he started taking an active role in the political spectrum. He served in several offices including Quay County Assessor (1920–1924), secretary of the New Mexico State Tax Commission (1925), and secretary of the Democratic State Central Committee.

Miles came virtually out of nowhere to be elected Governor in 1938. This was partially because the New Mexico Democratic Party was having a dispute at the time between those who supported Franklin Roosevelt's New Deal and those who opposed it. Miles, an in between who was not an advocate but also did not work against the New Deal, was seen as a compromise. His term was rather uneventful, especially compared to that of his predecessor.

Upon completion of Miles' term as Governor he returned to holding various low-level organizational positions including chairman of the Public Service Commission (1943–1948), and Commissioner of Public Lands (1947–1948).

Finally, in 1948, the Democratic Party figured Miles would be an easy shot to take out Georgia Lee Lusk in a primary for her Congressional seat. He just barely edged out Lusk, and only served one term as a Congressman (1949–1951) before retiring from public life. Miles died on October 7, 1971.

References

|-

|-

|-

1884 births
1971 deaths
20th-century American politicians
Democratic Party members of the United States House of Representatives from New Mexico
Democratic Party governors of New Mexico
Native American state legislators in New Mexico
New Mexico Commissioners of Public Lands
People from Murfreesboro, Tennessee
People from Quay County, New Mexico